Murali Krishna Chemuturi (popularly known as Murali Chemuturi) (born 28 June 1950)  is an Indian software development expert. He authored ten books, six on software development management, one on management, two translations (Ramayana, and Bhagavad Gita from Sanskrit into English) and one on personality engineering. He has also published a number of papers in journals and on the Internet.

Life and work
Born in Chityala, State of Andhra Pradesh, India to father Appa Rao Chemuturi and mother Chintapenta Vijaya Lakshmi, Murali Chemuturi studied Electrical Engineering at SMVM Polytechnic, Tanuku, followed by Industrial Engineering from Indian Institution of Industrial Engineering and PG Diploma in Computer Methods and Programming from AP Productivity Council. He finished academics with MBA from the College of Commerce and Business Management of Osmania University Hyderabad.

He started working at Electronics Corporation of India Limited, Tata Consultancy Services, Metamor Global Solutions at Hyderabad, and Vistaar eBusinesses Private Limited, Mumbai. He started Chemuturi Consultants in 2001. He had an impressive career starting in a humble position and rose to be the Vice-President of a software development organisation.

Among his contributions to software development methodology are the Software Size Units, for measuring the size of software product. SSU unlike the other units of measure does not use complexity for adjusting the software size. Software Test Units for measuring the size of software testing projects.  Composite Product Quality Rating (CPQR), for measuring the quality of a software product delivered under an outsourcing mode of software development; and the Measurement of Customer Satisfaction using Internal Data which can be used for measuring quantitatively the customer satisfaction for software development projects which would provide a realistic metric depicting the true customer satisfaction. All these are detailed in his books listed under references section.

He authored 11 books including one co-authored with Thomas M. Cagley Jr. which were all published in USA by reputed publishers, namely Springer Science+Business, CRC Press and J.Ross Publishing. All his books can be found on Amazon.com and other popular book sellers. .</ref>

He also authored a number of papers which were published in journals such as Computer Society of India Journal, Industrial Engineer, the journal of American Institute of Industrial Engineering, Academia website, Technology Evaluation Centers News Letter. Most of his papers and podcasts are available from chemuturi.com, brighthub.com, scribd.com, and freethoughtnation.com.

Murali Chemuturi worked on software development effort estimation and software project management which were captured in books. He is known for his pioneering work on Test Effort Estimation.

He worked on all aspects of information technology including software development, data processing, training as well as facility management.

He is the first person to state that the software development work is being carried out inefficiently inflating the costs of the software products. He is to software development industry what Ralph Nader was to automotive industry.

He enunciate this idea in his interview with Joe Dager of Business901 and exposed the neglect shown for the quality of the software products being dumped on the public.

He is the first and so far the only person to suggest that measurement of software development work is possible and advocated it. His paper on the subject was published in the Journal of Industrial Engineering, November 2010, published by the Institute of Industrial Engineering, USA.

The quality of his work can be assessed from the fact that there are more than 180 citations on the Google Scholar website

He advocated the principle of division of labor to increase the efficiency of software development work and to reduce the cost thereof. His article on the subject titled "Distributing Work for a Revolution" was published in the December 2011 issue of the official Journal of the IIE, USA.

For his contribution to the field of Information technology through his books, papers, as well as his new development of metrics and methodologies, he was selected and awarded the coveted award of Hall of Fame for IT Innovation and Excellence at Mumbai by the Computer Society of India on 15 October 2016.

Awards and honors
 Senior Member of Institute of Electrical and Electronics Engineers  – 2010,
 Senior Member of Computer Society of India  – 1998,
 Fellow of Industrial Engineering from Indian Institution of Industrial Engineering  – 1997,
 Outstanding Industrial Engineer from Indian Institution of Industrial Engineering  – 2011,
 Hall of Fame Award for IT Innovation and Excellence by Computer Society of India - 15 October 2016

Bibliography
 Book - Software Estimation: Best Practices, Tools and Techniques, year=2009, publisher – J.Ross Publishing, Inc, USA, Pages=298, 
 Book - Mastering Software Quality Assurance: Best Practices, Tools and Techniques, Year=2009, Publisher=J.Ross Publishing, Inc, USA, Pages=376, 
 Book - Mastering Software Project Management: Best Practices, Tools and Techniques co-authored with Thomas M. Cagley, Jr., 2010, J.Ross Publishing, Inc, USA, Pages=408, 
 Book - Requirements Engineering and Management for Software Development Projects, year=2012, publisher – Springer Science+Business, USA, Pages=287,
 Book - Mastering IT Project Management: Best Practices, Tools and Techniques, 2013, J.Ross Publishing, Inc, USA, Pages=384, 
 Book - Software Design:A Comprehensive Guide to Software Development Projects, 2018, CRC Press Taylor & Francis Group, Pages=324, 
 Book - Computer Programming for Beginners:A Step-By-Step Guide, 2018, CRC Press Taylor & Francis Group, Pages=258, 
 Book - Success in Life through Personality Engineering co-authored with Ronda Lee Bowen, 2011, CreateSpace, USA, Pages=236, 
 Book - Management: A New Paradigm for the 21st Century, Co-authored with Vijay Chemuturi, 2016,  Lulu.com USA,  Pages=430, 
 Book - Bhagavadh Geetha Translated from Sanskrit into English, 2015,  Double Bridge Publishing USA, ISBBN 978-1943091225 Pages=112
 Book - Raamayana of Maha Rushi Vaalmiki Translated from Sanskrit into English, 2014,  Re.Ad Publishing USA, 
 Chapter "Software Estimation – A Practitioner's Perspective", in the book "Software Quality: The Road Ahead", published by Tata McGraw Hill Education Private Limited, India, 2011
 Chapter "Impact of COPQ on Capacity Utilization", in the book "Cost of Poor Quality: Concept and Application", published by ICFAI University Press, India, 2008
 Chapter 6 on Effort Estimation for Software Development projects in the book, The IFPUG Guide to IT and Software Measurement, CRC Press, April 2012, USA

References

1950 births
Osmania University alumni
Engineers from Andhra Pradesh
Indian software engineers
Software engineering researchers
Living people
People from Ranga Reddy district